Grant Rohach (born February 5, 1994) is an American football quarterback who is currently a free agent. Rohach played college football for the Iowa State Cyclones and Buffalo Bulls.

Early years
Rohach attended Moorpark High School in Moorpark, California. He committed to Iowa State to play for coach Paul Rhoads.

College career

Iowa State
Rohach was redshirted as a freshman in 2012. For the 2013 season, he served as the primary backup quarterback to Cyclones starting quarterback Sam Richardson, starting the final four games of the season against TCU, Oklahoma, Kansas, and West Virginia, recording wins over the Jayhawks and Mountaineers. For the 2014 season, Rohach again served as the backup to Richardson, making one start on the season against Kansas. Rohach again served as the backup quarterback, but did not play at all during the 2015 season, leading to speculation that he would seek a transfer to another school in search of more playing time. On December 1, 2015, Rohach announced that he would transfer.

Buffalo
In December 2015, Rohach announced that he was transferring to Buffalo to play for coach Lance Leipold. As a graduate senior transfer, he was able to play immediately for the Bulls. Rohach was named Buffalo's starting quarterback to start the 2016 season. After a season-opening loss to Albany, Rohach was benched in favor of redshirt freshman Tyree Jackson. He made one more start, against Bowling Green in the final game of the season, following an injury to Jackson.

Professional career
On October 5, 2017, Rohach signed with the Iowa Barnstormers of the Indoor Football League. In five games, he completed 24 of 43 pass attempts for 295 yards and 7 touchdowns. He also rushed for 106 yards and three touchdowns.

References

External links
 Mount Marty profile
 Iowa State profile

Living people
1994 births
American football quarterbacks
Buffalo Bulls football players
Grand View Vikings football coaches
Iowa State Cyclones football players
Iowa Barnstormers players
Kansas State Wildcats football coaches
Mount Marty Lancers football coaches
Simpson Storm football coaches
People from Moorpark, California
Sportspeople from Iowa City, Iowa
Sportspeople from Ventura County, California
Coaches of American football from California
Players of American football from California